The 2016 City of Lincoln Council election took place on 5 May 2016 to elect members of City of Lincoln Council in England. This was held on the same day as other local elections. All 33 seats were up for election, with 3 councillors in each of the 11 wards being elected following a boundary review.

Overall results

|}

Ward results

Abbey

Birchwood

Boultham

Carholme

Castle

Glebe

Hartsholme

Minster

Moorland

Park

Witham

By-elections between 2016 and 2018

References

2016 English local elections
2016
2010s in Lincolnshire